Octoberman is a Canadian indie rock music group based in Vancouver, British Columbia. Fronted by singer-songwriter Marc Morrissette, the band also includes Tavo Diez de Bonilla on bass, Marshall Bureau on drums, as well as contributions from a number of frequent guest musicians.

History
Octoberman was formed in 2005 by Marc Morrissette when he returned home to Vancouver after taking time off from his earlier band, Kids These Days, to travel in Asia and Europe. He released the first Octoberman album, 2005's These Trails Are Old and New, as a solo artist, which contained songs about his travels. He subsequently expanded the project into a full band for their second album, 2007's Run from Safety.  By then he was no longer with Kids These Days.

Octoberman's third album, Fortresses, was released in September, 2009, and moved away from the band's earlier folk-related music toward a more indie rock sound. A video was released to promote the album's song "Thirty Reasons".

The group's fourth album Waiting in the Well, produced by Jim Guthrie and Marc Morrissette, was released in March 2012 on Saved By Records.

Octoberman's fifth album What More What More was released in August 2014 on Ishmalia Records. Mixed by Andy Magoffin at Preston, ON's House of Miracles, the 12-song collection found songwriter Marc Morrissette ruminating about death, "the loss of loved ones, friendships, or simply the world as he knows it."

Guest musicians have included Jim Guthrie (guitar, keyboards, vocals), Dave Mackinnon (piano), Francois Turenne (guitar), Andy Magoffin (horns), Randy Lee (violin), Anju Singh (violin, viola), Shaun Brodie (trumpet), Jessica Wilkin (piano), Sarah Hallman (background vocals), Peter Doig (guitar), Kris Hooper (lap steel), Jason Starnes (keyboards), Mike Morrissette (vocals), and Ryder Havdale (vocals). Former members include C.L. McLaughlin on guitars and background vocals, Leah Abramson on background vocals, Graham Christofferson on bass and Rob Josephson on drums. Regular members are Marc Morrissette (vocals, guitar), Marshall Bureau (drums), Tavo Diez de Bonilla (bass), and J.J. Ipsen (guitar, keyboards).

Discography
These Trails Are Old and New (2005)
Laguardia (2006, EP)
Run from Safety (2007)
Fortresses (2009)
Sweater (2011, EP)
Waiting in the Well (2012)
What More What More (2014)

References

External links
 Octoberman official website
 Octoberman at CBC Radio 3.

Musical groups established in 2005
Musical groups from Vancouver
Canadian indie rock groups
2005 establishments in British Columbia